Laurence Badie (born 15 June 1928) is a French actress. She appeared in more than one hundred films since 1952.

Selected filmography

References

External links 

1934 births
Living people
French film actresses